The Men's shot put event  at the 2011 European Athletics Indoor Championships were held on March 4, 2011 at 09:30 (qualification) and March 4, 17:30 (final) local time.

Records

Results

Qualification
Qualification: Qualification Performance 20.10 (Q) or at least 8 best performers advanced to the final. It was held at 09:30.

Final

References

Shot put at the European Athletics Indoor Championships
2011 European Athletics Indoor Championships